This is a list of the British Academy Television Awards for Best Actor. The Best Actor award was initially given as an "individual honour", without credit to a particular performance, until 1962, when Rupert Davies won for his performance in Maigret. 
Since 1970, nominees have been announced in addition to the winner. The Actor category was split into Leading Actor and Supporting Actor starting in 2010.

Michael Gambon holds the record of most wins in this category with four, including three consecutive wins, followed by Robbie Coltrane with three, all of them also being consecutive. Benedict Cumberbatch was received the most nominations for this award, with six.

Winners and nominees

1950s

1960s

1970s

1980s

1990s

2000s

2010s

2020s

{| class="wikitable" 
|-style="background:#bebebe;"
! style="width:5%;"| Year
! style="width:20%;"| Actors
! style="width:25%;"| Work
! style="width:20%;"| Character
! style="width:12%;"| Network
|-
|rowspan=5 style="text-align:center"| 2020 (66th)
|-style="background:#B0C4DE;"
| Jared Harris
|Chernobyl
| Valery Legasov
| Sky Atlantic
|-
|Stephen Graham 
|The Virtues
| Joseph Lowery
| Channel 4
|-
|Takehiro Hira 
|Giri/Haji
| Kenzo Mori
| BBC Two
|-
|Callum Turner
|The Capture
| Shaun Emery
| BBC One
|-
|rowspan=7 style="text-align:center"| 2021 (67th) 
|-style="background:#B0C4DE;"
|Paul Mescal
|Normal People
|Connell Waldron
| BBC Three
|-
| John Boyega
| Small Axe: Red, White and Blue
| Leroy Logan
| rowspan="3"|BBC One
|-
|Paapa Essiedu 
|I May Destroy You
| Kwame
|-
|Shaun Parkes 
| Small Axe: Mangrove
| Frank Crichlow
|-
|Josh O'Connor
|The Crown
| Charles, Prince of Wales
| Netflix
|-
|Waleed Zuaiter
| Baghdad Central
| Muhsin al-Khafaji
| Channel 4
|-
|rowspan=7 style="text-align:center"| 2022 (68th)
|-style="background:#B0C4DE;"
| Sean Bean| Time| Mark Cobden| BBC One|-
| Samuel Adewunmi 
| You Don't Know Me 
| Hero
| BBC One 
|-
| David Thewlis 
| Landscapers 
| Christopher Edwards 
| Sky Atlantic
|-
| Olly Alexander 
| It's a Sin 
| Ritchie Tozer 
| rowspan="2"|Channel 4
|-
| Stephen Graham 
| Help 
| Tony 
|-
| Hugh Quarshie 
| Stephen 
| Neville Lawrence 
| ITV
|-
|}

Actors with multiple wins and nominations

Multiple wins
The following people have been awarded the British Academy Television Award for Actor multiple times:4 winsMichael Gambon3 winsRobbie Coltrane2 winsAlan Badel
Peter Barkworth
Sean Bean
Alec Guinness
Mark Rylance
John Thaw

Multiple nominations
The following people have been nominated for the British Academy Television Award for Actor multiple times:6 nominationsBenedict Cumberbatch5 nominationsRobbie Coltrane4 nominationsKenneth Branagh
Michael Gambon
Albert Finney
Derek Jacobi
Ian Richardson
John Thaw3 nominationsSean Bean
Jim Broadbent
Michael Bryant
Stephen Graham
Alec Guinness
Leo McKern
Pete Postlethwaite
Michael Sheen
Timothy Spall
Ben Whishaw2 nominations'''
Alan Badel
Peter Barkworth
Alan Bates
Tom Bell
Colin Blakely
James Bolam
Robert Carlyle
George Cole
Christopher Eccleston
Denholm Elliott
Frank Finlay
Colin Firth
John Gielgud
Robert Hardy
Bernard Hill
Ian Holm
Anthony Hopkins
John Hurt
Toby Jones
Robert Lindsay
Ray McAnally
James Nesbitt
Laurence Olivier
Tim Pigott-Smith
Mark Rylance
Jared Harris
John Simm
Ken Stott
David Suchet
Dominic West
Timothy West
Tom Wilkinson

References

External links
List of winners at the British Academy of Film and Television Arts

Actor
 
Television awards for Best Actor